This list of active Russian Navy ships presents a picture which can never be fully agreed upon in the absence of greater data availability and a consistent standard for which ships are considered operational or not. The Soviet Navy, and the Russian Navy which inherited its traditions, had a different attitude to operational status than many Western navies. Ships went to sea less, and maintained capability for operations while staying in harbor.

The significant changes which followed the collapse of the Soviet Union then complicated the picture enormously. Determining which ships are operational or in refit can be difficult. Jane's Fighting Ships has noted in one of its 1999-2000 editions that some ships have little capability, but remain flying an ensign so that crews are entitled to be paid.

Jane's Fighting Ships online edition, dated 8 March 2010, added "There are large numbers of most classes 'in reserve', and flying an ensign so that skeleton crews may still be paid. [Their listing reflected] only those units assessed as having some realistic operational capability or some prospect of returning to service after refit."

During the 2010s there was a shift toward the production and introduction of modern light units to begin to replace large numbers of obsolescent corvettes, missile boats and mine counter-measures ships from the Soviet-era. In addition, there has been a renewed emphasis on submarine production with the introduction of nuclear-powered ballistic missile, nuclear-powered cruise missile as well as new classes of conventionally-powered attack submarines. This trend is forecast as likely to continue through the 2020s.

Fleets
Northern Fleet (NF)
Pacific Fleet (PF)
Black Sea Fleet (BSF)
Baltic Fleet (BF)
Caspian Flotilla (CF)

Ships and submarines in service 
(summary, 361 ships total)

 1 Aircraft carrier
 2 Battlecruisers
 2 Cruisers
 10 Destroyers
 11 Frigates
 81 Corvettes
 21 Landing ship tanks
 40 Landing craft
 18 Special-purpose ships
 4 Patrol ships
 57 Patrol boats
 47 Mine countermeasures vessels
 11 Ballistic missile submarines
 10 Cruise missile submarines
 16 Nuclear attack submarines 
 22 Diesel attack submarines
 8 Special-purpose submarines

Aircraft carrier

Battlecruisers

Cruisers

Destroyers

Frigates

Corvettes

Landing ships

Landing craft

Special-purpose ships

Patrol ships

Patrol boats

Mine countermeasures

Ballistic missile submarines

Cruise missile submarines

Nuclear attack submarines

Conventional attack submarines

Special-purpose submarines

Auxiliaries

Ships and submarines planned or under construction

Amphibious assault ships

Frigates

Corvettes

Landing ships

Special-purpose ships

Patrol ships

Patrol boats

Minesweepers

Ballistic missile submarines

Cruise missile submarines

Conventional attack submarines

Special purpose submarines

Auxiliaries

See also
 Future of the Russian Navy
 Lists of currently active military equipment by country

Footnotes

References

Active
Russia
Russia
Russian and Soviet military-related lists